{{Infobox book | 
| name          = Forever Peace
| title_orig    = 
| translator    = 
| image         = ForeverPeace(1stEd).jpg
| image_size = 200px
| caption = Cover of first edition (hardcover)
| author        = Joe Haldeman
| illustrator   = 
| cover_artist  = Bruce Jensen
| country       = United States
| language      = English
| series        = The Forever War series
| genre         = Science fiction novel
| publisher     = Ace Books
| release_date  = 1997
| english_release_date =
| media_type    = Print (hardback & paperback)
| pages         = 326
| isbn          = 0-441-00406-7
| dewey= 813/.54 21
| congress= PS3558.A353 F6 1997
| oclc= 36133306
| preceded_by   = The Forever War (1974)
| followed_by   = Forever Free (1999)
}}Forever Peace is a 1997 science fiction novel by Joe Haldeman. It won the Nebula Award, Hugo Award and John W. Campbell Memorial Award in 1998.

Plot
Though its title is similar to The Forever War, and both novels deal with soldiers in the future, Forever Peace'' is not a direct sequel and takes place on a different future of Earth in the year 2048.

Using remotely controlled robots called "soldierboys" (which are nearly invincible), the Alliance military fights third world guerrillas in an endless series of economy-driven wars. As only first world nations possess the nanoforge technology that can produce anything from basic materials, conflict is largely asymmetric.

The novel is told partly in first-person narration by the main character, Julian Class, and partly by an anonymous third-person narrator, who is able to comment on aspects of Julian's personality and background.

The main protagonist, Julian Class, is a physicist and a mechanic who operates a soldierboy. Thanks to electronic "jacks" implanted in their skulls, mechanics are remotely linked to the machinery as well as to each other, being able to experience battle through the machines and read the thoughts of other mechanics who are simultaneously jacked in.

After attempting suicide, Julian and his lover, Amelia "Blaze" Harding, are made aware of a problem with an automated particle physics project that could potentially trigger a new Big Bang that destroys the Earth and the rest of the universe. Because it's so easy to do, it is speculated that universes could potentially have only the lifespan of the first civilization that attempts such a project. When Julian, Blaze, and another physicist submit their paper to a journal's review board, they find themselves the target of "The Hammer of God", a Christian cult bent on hastening an anticipated end of the universe. As the Hammer of God has a secret presence throughout the government, Julian and Blaze narrowly miss being assassinated.

Marty Larrin, one of the inventors of jacking technology, recruits Julian and Blaze in an attempt to use the technology to end war for all time; a little-known secret is that jacking with someone else for a long enough period (about two weeks) will psychologically eliminate the ability to kill another human being. By "humanizing" the entire world, dangerous technology would not be a problem for human survival. They do so, stop the particle accelerator's construction, and the war is eventually ended.

Reception
 Hugo Award winner, 1998
 Nebula Award winner, 1998
 John W. Campbell Memorial Award winner, 1998
 Locus Award nominee, 1998

References

External links
 Forever Peace at Worlds Without End

1997 American novels
1997 science fiction novels
American science fiction novels
Brain–computer interfacing in fiction
Hugo Award for Best Novel-winning works
John W. Campbell Award for Best Science Fiction Novel-winning works
Military science fiction novels
Nebula Award for Best Novel-winning works
Novels by Joe Haldeman
Ace Books books